Ludenberg is an urban quarter of Düsseldorf, part of Borough 7. It borders on Gerresheim, Grafenberg, Hubbelrath and Rath.

Until the beginning of the 19th century, Ludenberg belonged to the mayor's office of Gerresheim together with Erkrath, Vennhausen, Unterbach, Morp, Dorp and Bruchhausen. In 1852 the office of Gerresheim was split into Gerresheim-town and Gerresheim-countryside. So Ludenberg became an independent village with its own mayor. In 1909, Ludenberg became a part of Düsseldorf - together with Gerresheim.

Ludenberg has a lot of infrastructure, such including: 
 the race-course of Düsseldorf
 the central psychiatrical clinic of the northern rhineland and
 the traditional tennis club Rochusclub.

References

Urban districts and boroughs of Düsseldorf